Du'ao (died 672 BC), also called Zhuang'ao, was from 676 to 672 BC king of the state of Chu during the Spring and Autumn period of ancient China.  He was born Xiong Jian and Du'ao was his posthumous title.

Du'ao succeeded his father King Wen of Chu, who died in 677 BC.  In 672 BC he tried to kill his younger brother Xiong Yun, who escaped to the state of Sui.  Xiong Yun attacked and killed Du'ao with the help of Sui, and succeeded Du'ao as King Cheng of Chu.

References

Monarchs of Chu (state)
7th-century BC Chinese monarchs
672 BC deaths
Year of birth unknown
Chinese kings
7th-century BC murdered monarchs
Assassinated Chinese politicians